Rüde is a village and a former municipality in the district of Schleswig-Flensburg, in Schleswig-Holstein, Germany. Since 1 March 2013, it is part of the municipality Mittelangeln.

References

Former municipalities in Schleswig-Holstein